Maaike Boogaard (born 24 August 1998) is a Dutch racing cyclist, who currently rides for UCI Women's Continental Team .

Major results
2018
Combativity award Stage 2 The Women's Tour
2022
1st Omloop van Borsele
8th Overall Grand Prix Elsy Jacobs

References

External links
 

1998 births
Living people
Dutch female cyclists
People from Hoorn
Cyclists from North Holland
20th-century Dutch women
20th-century Dutch people
21st-century Dutch women